The traditional Chinese calendar divides a year into 24 solar terms (節氣). Hánlù, Kanro, Hallo, or Hàn lộ is the 17th solar term. It begins when the Sun reaches the celestial longitude of 195° and ends when it reaches the longitude of 210°. It more often refers in particular to the day when the Sun is exactly at the celestial longitude of 195°. In the Gregorian calendar, it usually begins around October 8 and ends around October 23.

Pentads

鴻雁來賓, 'The guest geese arrive' – Geese which completed their migration in summer were considered 'hosts', and the later-flying ones as 'guests'. This pentad can also be interpreted as 'The geese arrive at the water's edge'.
雀入大水為蛤, 'The sparrows enter the ocean and become clams'
菊有黃華, 'Chrysanthemums bloom yellow' – the chrysanthemum is known as one of the few flowers to bloom in autumn.

Date and time

References

Autumn
17